Barchov may refer to places in the Czech Republic:

Barchov (Hradec Králové District), a municipality and village
Barchov (Pardubice District), a municipality and village